The Sporolactobacillaceae are a family of Gram-positive bacteria including the genera Sinobaca, Sporolactobacillus, and Tuberibacillus.

References

 

Bacillales